Galitia Citybook is a supplement published by West End Games in 1994 for the fantasy-noir role-playing game Bloodshadows, using the generic role-playing rules of Masterbook.

Contents
The original Bloodshadows campaign setting (1994) was based in the city of Selastos. Galitia Citybook describes the sister city of Galitia, with details of its thousand-year history, city districts, and notable people. The book also includes new monsters and some suggested adventure hooks, although it does not include a full adventure.

Publication history
West End Games originally published the generic Masterbook set of role-playing game rules in 1994, quickly followed by the fantasy-noir Bloodshadows setting. The Bloodshadows supplement Galitia Citybook also appeared in 1994, a 128-page softcover book written by Teeuwynn Woodruff, with artwork by Tim Bobko, Tom O'Neill and Brian Schomburg.

Reception
In the March 1995 edition of Dragon (Issue #215), Rick Swan was ambivalent about the book, commenting "most of it's interesting, but there's nothing noteworthy." Swan didn't like the lack of a full adventure, and criticized the writing style as "awkward". He concluded by giving this book an average rating of 3 out of 6, calling it "an iffy buy."

References

Fantasy role-playing game supplements
Role-playing game books
Role-playing game supplements introduced in 1994